The César Award for Best Documentary Film is an award presented by the Académie des Arts et Techniques du Cinéma since 1995.

History 
In 1995, director Marcel Ophüls protested that his film, the documentary Vigils of Arms: A History of Wartime Journalism on the Bosnian War, was eligible only in the usual categories as a work of fiction. The César Academy exceptionally created the César for documentaries and documentary films, which did not satisfy Ophüls, on the temporary nature of the award, he resigned from the Academy. 

The César for best documentary has been permanent since 2007.

Following a modification of the César rules on November 8, 2016, it is no longer possible for a film to combine the César for best documentary film with that for best film.

Winners and nominees

1990s

2000s

2010s

2020s

See also
Academy Award for Best Documentary Feature
BAFTA Award for Best Documentary

References

External links 
 Official website 
 César Award for Best Documentary Film at AlloCiné

Film Documentary
Documentary film awards